Gabriel Perelle (born 1604 in Vernon, Eure, died 1677 in Paris) was a French draftsman and printmaker of topographic views and landscapes.

A pupil of Simon Vouet, Perelle specialized in classical landscapes not dissimilar to those of Francisque Millet, although more obviously decorative. He founded an etching workshop, and his sons Nicolas and Adam assisted him.

Perelle was also a pupil of Daniel Rabel and produced several hundred engravings both from his own drawings and from those of other artists such as Israël Silvestre, Paul Bril, Jacques Callot, Michel Corneille the Elder, Jan Asselijn, Jacques Fouquières, Cornelis Poelenburg, and Sébastien Pontault de Beaulieu. These engravings in the etching and intaglio mainly depict landscapes of the Paris region, including views of castles, where he introduced the variety by adding ruins and various accessories.

References

External links

Veües des plus beaux lieux de France et d'Italie  : Digitized album containing 283 prints (Princeton University Digital Library)

1604 births
1677 deaths
French printmakers
French draughtsmen
People from Vernon, Eure